The 1992 United States Olympic trials for track and field were held at Tad Gormley Stadium in New Orleans, Louisiana. Organised by The Athletics Congress (TAC), the ten-day competition lasted from June 19 until June 28 and also served as the national championships in track and field for the United States.  This was the first time the Olympic trials served in the dual capacity since 1932.  The men's Marathon trials were held April 11, in Columbus, Ohio.

The results of the event determined qualification for the United States at the 1992 Summer Olympics held in Barcelona, Spain.

These trials also saw the premature conclusion of the Dan & Dave Reebok advertising campaign as Dan O'Brien failed to make the Olympic team in the Decathlon after missing his attempts in the Pole vault.

1992 U.S. Olympic track and field trials results

1992 U.S. Olympic track and field trials results

Key:
.

Men

Men track events

Men field events

Women

Women track events

Women field events

References

External links
USA Track and Field

USA Outdoor Track and Field Championships
US Olympic Trials
Track, Outdoor
United States Summer Olympics Trials
Track and field
United States Olympic Trials (track and field)
United States Olympic Trials (track and field)
Track and field in Louisiana